Northgate House is a Grade I listed house in Northgate Street, Bury St Edmunds. It was home to the novelist Norah Lofts from 1955 until her death in 1983.

References

Grade I listed buildings in Suffolk
Bury St Edmunds